The Milwaukee Panthers women's basketball team is an NCAA Division I college basketball team competing in the Horizon League for the University of Wisconsin–Milwaukee. The current head coach is Kyle Rechlicz replacing longtime head coach Sandy Botham in 2012.

The Panthers have also won two conference titles in 2001 and 2006 with that they have won two conference tournament titles in 2001 and 2006.

History

The Milwaukee women's basketball teams' began with the 1971–72 school year where they competed at the AIAW level. It moved to NAIA in 1982 before moving to NCAA Division 2 in the 1987 season. Since 1990, the program has been competing in NCAA Division I. It made its first NCAA Tournament appearance in 2001 and its second in 2006.

NCAA tournament results
The Panthers have appeared in two NCAA Tournaments. Their combined record is 0–2.

WNIT Tournament results
The Panthers have appeared in one WNIT Tournament. Their combined record is 0–1.

WBI Tournament results
The Panthers have appeared in one WBI Tournament. Their combined record is 2–1.

NAIA Division I
The Lady Panthers appeared twice in the NAIA Division I women's basketball tournament. Their combined record was 6–2.

Year-by-year records

References

External links